Kyrkjebø (historically: Kirkebø) is a village in Høyanger Municipality in Vestland county, Norway. The village is located on the northern shore of the Sognefjorden, about halfway between the small Vadheimsfjorden and Høyangsfjorden arms which branch off the main fjord.

The village was the administrative centre of the old municipality of Kyrkjebø which existed from 1858 until its dissolution in 1964.

Name
The village is named after the old Kirkebø farm, since Kyrkjebø Church was located there. The first element of the name is identical with the name for "church", and the second element of the name is identical with the word for "farm". It was named this because it was the farm where the church was located.  From 1890 until 1917 the name was spelled Kirkebø (using the Bokmål spelling) and then in 1917 it was changed to Kyrkjebø (using the Nynorsk spelling).

References

Villages in Vestland
Høyanger